Sasini is one of Kenya's major tea and coffee producers, and is one of the country's "Big 6" tea producers.  The company's headquarters are located in Nairobi and the company's stock is listed on the Nairobi Stock Exchange.

Sasini is a member of the Sameer Group of Companies, which is also located in Kenya.

Operations
Tea is grown by a Sasini subsidiary, Kipkebe Limited, which operates two major CTC factories (Kipkebe and Keritor) serving four estates and outgrowers in Western Kenya, with a combined production capacity of over 10 million kilograms of tea annually.  Tea is exported by Sasini to Egypt and the United Kingdom among others.

Coffee The company's coffee plantations are located at altitude in central Kenya with facilities in Kiambu County and Nyeri County.  Sasini's Mweiga Estate in Nyeri District has an airstrip capable of transshipment of planeloads of not less than 5,700 bags of coffee.

Dairy and Horticulture Sasini's dairy division produces milk and flavored yoghurts, as well as producing milk for sale to the food industry in general.  Its horticulture division is growing, producing such vegetables as peas and corn.

Retail coffee shops Sasini has recently started rolling out coffee shops in Nairobi, with aim to spread outside Kenya. This is seen as a valuable addition to shareholders. They sell packaged versions of their products, as well as mugs, brewing necessities, and tea balls.

See also 
 Coffee Industry of Kenya

References

External links 
 Sasini Tea & Coffee

Food and drink companies of Kenya
Companies based in Nairobi
Companies listed on the Nairobi Securities Exchange
Coffee brands
Kenyan brands
Tea brands
Tea companies of Kenya